José Carlos Ramírez (born August 12, 1992) is an American professional boxer. He is a former unified light welterweight champion, having held the WBC title from 2018 to May 2021 and the WBO title from 2019 to May 2021. As an amateur he was the number one rated in the WBC lightweight in the United States and represented the U.S at the 2012 Olympics. As of June 2020, he is ranked as the world's second best active light welterweight by The Ring and BoxRec, and third by the Transnational Boxing Rankings Board.

Amateur career

Ramírez won the United States national amateur boxing championships Lightweight tournament at the U.S. Olympic Training Center in Colorado Springs, Colorado. He's also a Jr. Golden Gloves National Champion, two-time Jr. Olympic National Champion, and a two-time Ringside World Champion. His family currently lives in Avenal, California where he's lived all his life. Jose qualified to represent the United States at the 2012 Olympics by defeating 2008 Olympian Raynell Williams 21-16 in the finals of the 2012 United States Olympic Boxing Trials. Ramírez beat Rachid Azzedine and then lost to Fazliddin Gaibnazarov at the 2012 Summer Olympics in London.

Professional career

Early career 
Ramírez turned professional in 2012 and has been promoted by Bob Arum as a Top Rank fighter since the same year.

After compiling a perfect 15-0 record, Ramírez beat Johnny Garcia by unanimous decision on December 5, 2015 to win the vacant WBC Continental Americas light welterweight title. He would go on to defend the title a total of four times.

WBC light welterweight champion

Ramírez vs. Imam 
On March 17, 2018, Ramírez defeated Amir Imam by unanimous decision with scores of 120-108, 117-111 and 115-113 to win the vacant WBC super lightweight title. Ramírez had badly swelled Imam's right eye and landed all kinds of hard punches throughout the fight.

Ramírez vs. Orozco 
In his next fight, Ramírez faced Antonio Orozco, then #3 by the WBC at light welterweight, at the Save Mart Center in Fresno, California. In an action-packed fight, the defending champion managed to drop his opponent twice, once in the fourth, and once in the eighth round. Despite the two knockdowns, Orozco gave his all and even was the aggressor at times. In the end, it was a clear win for Ramírez, all three judges scoring the fight 119-107 in favor of the champion.

Ramírez vs. Zepeda 
In his next title defense, Ramírez faced Jose Zepeda, ranked #14 by the WBC at light welterweight. Zepeda was winning the early rounds of the fight. Ramírez started to gain control of the fight in the fourth round. Ramírez finished the fight strong, especially in the last 20 seconds, unleashing power shots on Zepeda. Ramírez won the fight via majority decision in a very competitive fight.

Unified light welterweight champion

Ramírez vs. Hooker 
On July 27, 2019, Ramírez fought undefeated WBO light welterweight champion Maurice Hooker in a unification fight. In an action-packed fight, Ramírez first managed to drop Hooker in the opening round, and despite replays showing that Ramírez had stepped on Hooker's foot, it was ruled an official knockdown. As the rounds went on, the fight slowed down, which seemed to favor Hooker. However, in the sixth round, Ramírez connected on a left hand to the chin, followed by another big left to the head, which sent Hooker reeling against the ropes. As Hooker was helpless, the referee stopped the fight with 1:48 to go in the round, awarding Ramírez the technical knockout victory.

Ramírez vs. Postol 
On August 29, 2020, Ramírez defended his WBC and WBO titles against former WBC champion Viktor Postol, winning a majority decision with scores of 116-112, 115-113, 114-114.

Ramírez vs. Taylor 

On May 22, 2021, Ramírez attempted to become the first undisputed champion of Mexican descent when he faced undefeated unified champion Josh Taylor in Paradise, Nevada in a showdown for the undisputed light welterweight championship. Ramírez was knocked down twice in the sixth and seventh rounds, both times by Taylor's left hand, and ultimately lost by unanimous decision with all three judges scoring the bout 114-112 in favor of Taylor.

Continued light welterweight career

Ramírez vs. Pedraza 
On October 30, 2021, it was revealed that Ramírez would face the former two-weight world champion José Pedraza on February 5, 2022, in the main event of an ESPN broadcast Top Rank card. The bout was later postponed for March 4, as Pedraza fell ill with flu-like symptoms. Ramirez won the bout by unanimous decision in a competitive fight, By all judges scoring it 116-112.

Professional boxing record

Personal life
Ramírez is of Mexican descent, his parents are from the state of Michoacán.

See also
List of world light-welterweight boxing champions
List of Mexican boxing world champions

References

External links

Jose Ramírez Amateur record at Boxing scoop
José Ramírez - Profile, News Archive & Current Rankings at Box.Live

1992 births
Living people
Light-welterweight boxers
World light-welterweight boxing champions
World Boxing Council champions
World Boxing Organization champions
People from Kings County, California
Boxers from California
American male boxers
American boxers of Mexican descent
Olympic boxers of the United States
Boxers at the 2012 Summer Olympics
Winners of the United States Championship for amateur boxers